Bob Ebinger is a Democratic Party member of the Montana House of Representatives, representing District 62 since 2007.

External links
Montana House of Representatives - Bob Ebinger official MT State Legislature website
Project Vote Smart - Representative Bob Ebinger (MT) profile
Follow the Money - Bob Ebinger
2006 campaign contributions

Members of the Montana House of Representatives
1944 births
Living people